Sumire Kita (born 11 January 2001) is a retired Japanese individual rhythmic gymnast. She is the 2016 Asian Junior all-around champion, the 2022 Asian Senior all-around silver medalist and two-time Japanese National Junior champion.

Personal life 
Kita started doing rhythmic gymnastics at age two. Her mother also practiced rhythmic gymnastics until she went to university. Kita speaks Japanese and Russian.

Her younger sister, Mirano Kita, is also an individual rhythmic gymnast and has represented Japan at multiple international FIG events.

Career
In 2013, Kita debuted at the Japan National Rhythmic Gymnastics Championships where she became the youngest ever to take 2nd place. Kita was coached by Yu Liu, a former Chinese rhythmic gymnast who came to Japan to study and met Kita at her small gymnastics studio in Kagawa Prefecture, recognizing a gymnast with great potential. Kita since then spends part of her training in Russia's famous Novogorsk center for rhythmic gymnastics.

Kita competed at the 2014 Aeon Cup. In 2015, she competed at the Junior Grand Prix in Moscow and numerous other junior tournaments, including events in Lisbon, Corbeil-Essonnes and Budapest. Kita also finished 5th in the junior all-around at the 2015 Aeon Cup in Tokyo, Japan. At the 2016 Asian Junior Championships in Astana, Kita won gold medals in the all-around, rope, clubs and bronze medals in hoop, ball, team.

Since 2017, Kita parted with her childhood coach Liu and began training under Elena Nefedova, she debuted in the World Cup Series competing at the 2017 World Challenge Cup Guadalajara where she finished 17 in the all-around, she qualified in 1 apparatus final in clubs  finishing in 8th place. On June 24–27, Kita competed at the 2017 Asian Championships where she finished 4th in the all-around, Kita together with the Japanese team won the bronze medal. She qualified in 2 apparatus final and won bronze in ribbon, placed 5th in hoop. On July 7–9, Kita finished 9th in the all-around at the 2017 Berlin World Challenge Cup, she qualified in ball final finishing in 7th place. On August 5–7, Kita finished 10th in the all-around behind Olena Diachenko at the 2017 Minsk World Challenge Cup, she qualified in the hoop and ribbon finals finishing in 8th place for both events. On August 11–13, Kita competed at the 2017 Kazan World Challenge Cup finishing 14th in the all-around, she did not qualify in any of apparatus finals. On August 30 - September 3, Kita and Kaho Minagawa represented in the individual competitions for Japan at the 2017 World Championships in Pesaro, Italy; she qualified in the hoop final and finished in 7th place. Kita finished 12th in the all-around final behind Evita Griskenas

In 2018, Kita started the season with a competition at the 2018 Moscow Grand Prix finishing 8th in the all-around, she qualified into the clubs and ribbon finals.

In 2021, Kita has been chosen to represent Japan at the Olympic Games in Tokyo along team mate Chisaki Oiwa. Kita was in eleventh place in the overall individual ranking of the top 10 final, being out by 0.300 difference with the Ukrainian Khrystyna Pohranychna.

Routine music information

References

External links
 
 Rhythmic Gymnastics Results
 

2001 births
Living people
Japanese rhythmic gymnasts
Sportspeople from Kagawa Prefecture
Gymnasts at the 2020 Summer Olympics
Olympic gymnasts of Japan
21st-century Japanese women